Miguel Portela de Morais (born 4 March 1974 in Lisbon) is a Portuguese former rugby union player. He played as a center, although he was also capable of nearly all positions, except prop and hooker. He was a leading member of the Grupo Desportivo Direito team. Professionally, he is a lawyer.

Miguel Portela had 56 caps, from 1996 to 2010, with 5 tries and a drop goal scored, in an aggregate of 28 points.

He was a member of the Portuguese squad present at the 2007 Rugby World Cup finals. He played in all four matches, without scoring.He had 4 children Jerónimo Portela Morais , Duarte Portela Morais, Benedita Portela Morais and Rosinha Portela Morais a mais linda

External links
 cdp.pt

1974 births
Living people
Portuguese rugby union players
Rugby union centres
Rugby union players from Lisbon
Portugal international rugby union players